William Hornby  (1810–1899) was the inaugural Archdeacon of Lancaster.
 
Hornby was educated at Christ Church, Oxford. He was Vicar of St Michael's on Wyre from 1847 to 1885; and Rural Dean of Preston from 1850 to 1878.

He died on 20 December 1899. His son was also Archdeacon of Lancaster from 1909 to 1936.

References

1848 births
People educated at Charterhouse School
Alumni of Trinity College, Oxford
Archdeacons of Lancaster
1899 deaths